Talatama is named as the oldest son of Tuitātui and succeeded him as the 12th Tuʻi Tonga (king of Tonga) somewhere in the middle of the 12th century AD.

They lived at Heketā, along the northcoast of Tongatapu, with its rocky shore. Launching and landing canoes was difficult and the surf of the sea was always noisy. The nearby village of Kolonga, nowadays is nicknamed Utulongoaa (noisy coast), because that was what Talatama's sister Fatafehi said.

Either to please her or just to find a better harbour for themselves Talatama and his younger brother Talaihaapepe decided to move the royal court to Mua (meaning: first, because as the new capital, the village would be the first to receive honours). Indeed, the coast there was sandy and muddy, safe for the boats, the big royal canoes, named Ākiheuho and Tongafuesia, and it was quiet. The place was named Fangalongonoa (silent shore).

Since that time, up to the last Tui Tonga, Laufilitonga, the dynasty has always remained in Mua.

When Talatama died he had no sons. Talaihaapepe seemed to be the most straightforward one to succeed him, but he himself saw it as a bad omen to break the tradition from father to son. Now when Talaihaapepe had been a boy (some say he was still a boy at that time) he had a doll, made of tou wood, called Tamatou. This doll was declared the son of Talatama and installed with all the pomp and splendour of a Tui Tonga, even a queen was assigned to him, and he was named Tui-Tonga-nui-(ko-e)-tama-tou (Great Tonga king (that is) tou person).

Three years later Talaihaapepe declared that the king, Tamatou, had died and would be buried in a vault, while his wife was supposed to have been pregnant and born a son. This son, Talatama's grandson, would succeed as the 14th Tui Tonga. Needless to say that this was Talaihaapepe himself.

Notes

References
 I.C. Campbell; Classical Tongan kingship; 1989
 E. Bott; Tonga society at the time of Captain Cook's visit; 1982
 O. Māhina; Images from the history and culture of Tonga; 2006
 E.W. Gifford; Tongan myths and tales; BPB bulletin 8, 1924

Tongan monarchs
Year of birth unknown
Place of birth unknown
Year of death unknown